Bergliot Ibsen (née Bjørnson; 10 June 1869 – 2 February 1953) was a  Norwegian mezzo-soprano singer.

Biography

She was born Bergliot Bjørnson in Christiania (now Oslo, Norway) as the  daughter of writer and Nobel laureate Bjørnstjerne Bjørnson and Karoline Bjørnson (née Reimers). She was married to politician Sigurd Ibsen (1859-1930), son of playwright Henrik Ibsen and Suzannah Ibsen.  Her husband later became Norwegian Prime Minister in Stockholm. They were the parents of Tancred Ibsen, Eleonora Borberg and Irene Ibsen Bille.

Bergliot Ibsen made her concert début in Paris in 1880, and later toured in Norway and Denmark. In 1948 she published the memoir book De tre on the three Ibsens: Henrik, Suzannah and Sigurd.

She died in Bolzano, Italy in 1953. She was buried in Oslo at Æreslunden in Vår Frelsers gravlund.

References

External links

1869 births
1953 deaths
Musicians from Oslo
Norwegian women singers
Norwegian memoirists
Bergliot
Norwegian expatriates in Italy
Norwegian expatriates in France
Burials at the Cemetery of Our Saviour